Misema may refer to:

Places
Misema Lake, in northeastern Ontario, Canada
Misema River, in northeastern Ontario, Canada
Little Misema River, in northeastern Ontario, Canada

Other uses
Acrolophus misema, a moth of the family Acrolophidae
Misema Caldera, a 2,704-2,707 million year old caldera in Ontario and Quebec, Canada